The 1957–58 WHL season was the sixth season of the Western Hockey League. The Vancouver Canucks were the President's Cup champions as they beat the Calgary Stampeders in four games in the final series.

Final standings 

bold - qualified for playoffs

Playoffs 
The Vancouver Canucks win the President's Cup 4 games to 0.

References 

Western Hockey League (1952–1974) seasons
1957–58 in American ice hockey by league
1957–58 in Canadian ice hockey by league